In knot theory, a Lissajous knot is a knot defined by parametric equations of the form

The projection of a Lissajous knot onto any of the three coordinate planes is a Lissajous curve, and many of the properties of these knots are closely related to properties of Lissajous curves.

Replacing the cosine function in the parametrization by a triangle wave transforms every Lissajous
knot isotopically into a billiard curve inside a cube, the simplest case of so-called billiard knots.
Billiard knots can also be studied in other domains, for instance in a cylinder or in a (flat) solid torus (Lissajous-toric knot).

Form 
Because a knot cannot be self-intersecting, the three integers  must be pairwise relatively prime, and none of the quantities

may be an integer multiple of pi.

Examples 
Here are some examples of Lissajous knots, all of which have :

There are infinitely many different Lissajous knots, and other examples with 10 or fewer crossings include the 74 knot, the 815 knot, the 101 knot, the 1035 knot, the 1058 knot, and the composite knot 52* # 52, as well as the 916 knot, 1076 knot, the 1099 knot, the 10122 knot, the 10144 knot, the granny knot, and the composite knot 52 # 52.  In addition, it is known that every twist knot with Arf invariant zero is a Lissajous knot.

Symmetry 

Odd case 

In general, a knot that has an orientation-preserving point reflection symmetry is known as strongly plus amphicheiral. This is a fairly rare property: only seven or eight prime knots with twelve or fewer crossings are strongly plus amphicheiral (1099, 10123, 12a427, 12a1019, 12a1105, 12a1202, 12n706, and an undecided case, 12a435). Since this is so rare, ′most′ prime Lissajous knots lie in the even case.

Even case 
If one of the frequencies (say ) is even, then the 180° rotation around the x-axis  is a symmetry of the Lissajous knot.  In general, a knot that has a symmetry of this type is called 2-periodic, so every even Lissajous knot must be 2-periodic.

Consequences 

The symmetry of a Lissajous knot puts severe constraints on the Alexander polynomial.  In the odd case, the Alexander
polynomial of the Lissajous knot must be a perfect square.  In the even case, the Alexander polynomial must be a perfect square modulo 2.  In addition, the Arf invariant of a Lissajous knot must be zero.  It follows that:
 The trefoil knot and figure-eight knot are not Lissajous.
 No torus knot can be Lissajous.
 No fibered 2-bridge knot can be Lissajous.

References 

Knots (knot theory)